Gotham City Garage is a digital comic series published by DC Comics, and inspired by a DC collectibles statue line reimagining DC's female heroes as bikers. The series is set in an alternate version of the DC Universe in which Lex Luthor has turned Gotham City into a paradise known as The Garden. Characters include Supergirl, Wonder Woman, Batgirl, Big Barda, and others.

Background

Gotham City Garage is the second comic book series to be spun off from DC Comics' line of collectible statues. DC Bombshells, characters based on 40s-style pin-up heroines, was the first line of collectibles to be turned into a digital comic, and began publishing in 2015. The Gotham City Garage collectibles were launched in 2013, and in 2017 the characters were used to form the basis of a new digital comic series of the same name.

Collected editions

English version by DC

References

External links
DC page: GCG2017

Comics
Superhero_comics
Gotham_City
Comics_about_women
DC_Comics_titles